Milange District is a district of Zambezia Province in Mozambique. The town of Milange is the district center.

History 
Milange District was one of the areas where the Revolutionary Party of Mozambique (PRM) operated during the Mozambican Civil War's early stages. The PRM attacked the village of Mongue in the district in May 1981, and again raided the area in the following month.

Villages and chiefdoms 
 Mongue
 Sabelua
 Tengua
 Nhazombe
 Congono
 Mandua
 Gerasse
 Saenda
 Ponderane
 Vulalo

References

Works cited

Further reading
District profile (PDF)

Districts in Zambezia Province